Good Arrows is the English band Tunng's third album, released in August 2007 on Full Time Hobby in the UK and Thrill Jockey in the U.S. and Canada.

A limited edition version of the album was also released which contained two extra tracks: "Wood" and "Clump".

Track listing
"Take" (Sam Genders, Tunng) – 3:24
"Bricks" (Genders, Tunng) – 4:19
"Hands" (Genders, Tunng) – 3:40
"Bullets" (Genders, Tunng) – 5:58
"Soup" (Mike Lindsay, Tunng) – 3:32
"Spoons" (Lindsay, Tunng) – 1:58
"King" (Ben Bickerton, Tunng) – 3:06
"Arms" (Genders, Tunng) – 5:16
"Secrets" (Genders, Lindsay, Tunng) – 3:31
"String" (Genders, Becky Jacobs, Tunng) – 2:44
"Cans" (Genders, Phil Winter, Tunng) – 5:26
"Wood" [extra track on limited CD] – 4:46
"Clump" [extra track on limited CD] – 4:31

References

External links
 Official Tunng discography page containing information about the album.
 Lyrics from the album.

Tunng albums
2007 albums
Full Time Hobby albums
Thrill Jockey albums